John Read Giordano (born December 31, 1937) is an American orchestra conductor, professor of music, composer, and former concert saxophonist.  He is Associate Professor of Music at Texas Christian University.  He is Music Director Emeritus of the Fort Worth Symphony Orchestra where he served as Music Director and Conductor for 27 years, Founder of the Fort Worth Chamber Orchestra, Jury Chairman of the Van Cliburn International Piano Competition since 1973, Music Director Emeritus of the Youth Orchestra of Greater Fort Worth, Founder and Director of the Colorado College Summer Music Festival and Conservatory, Director of Chamber Music for the Bowdoin Summer Music Festival, International Guest Conductor, published composer and arranger with an extensive award-winning discography.

Education
Giordano holds the following diplomas:

 1960 — Texas Christian University, Bachelor of Music Education (composition)
 Texas Christian University, Master of Music
 Conservatoire Royal de Musique, Brussels, Diploma Superieure (Fulbright Scholar)
 University of North Texas, Doctor of Musical Arts

Giordano also studied at the University of California and the Eastman School of Music.  While studying at the Brussels Conservatory, he studied saxophone with Francois Daneels, who was recognized as one of Europe's leading saxophone virtuosos.

Published work & academic appointments
 Fantasy, for Alto Saxophone and Piano, Southern Music Co., San Antonio (c1969)
 March 1966 — While a grad student at the University of North Texas College of Music, Giordano was appointed Assistant Conductor of the Fort Worth Youth Symphony when it was formed.
 April 13, 1966 — Giordano premiered a composition for saxophone wind ensemble, performed by the Dallas Symphony.  He composed the work through his involvement with the Composer-Performer Workshop at the University of North Texas.  Another one of his compositions, built a 12-tone theme, was simply read by the orchestra during rehearsal.
 July 11, 1966 — The University of North Texas regents approved the appointment of Giordano to teach in the College of Music as Artist in Residence.  Giordano served at the University of North Texas until 1973, when, a year earlier, he was appointed conductor of the Fort Worth Symphony.

Saxophonist 
Giordano is known well as a symphony conductor.  But he also had a distinguished career as a saxophonist.  Early in his career, one of his notable performances was in London with the BBC Symphony Chamber Orchestra performing Jacques Ibert's Concertino da Camera under the direction of Francis Chagrin on May 12, 1971.  In December 1971, Giordano toured France and Belgium, performing concert saxophone on Flemish and French radio and television and in the cities of Tubize, Dinant, Brussels, Enghien, Antwerp, Paris, Givet, and Marcinelle.

Family
John Giordano is married to Mary Alice Giordano (nee Dammann).  They have three children:

 Jacqueline Anne Giordano (married Stephen B Lasko, 1992, Fort Worth)
 Ellen Elaine Giordano (married Stewart G Austin, Jr. 1994, Fort Worth)
 John Bishop Giordano (married Veronica F Barron, 1995, Fort Worth)

External links
 Biography, Corpus Christi Symphony Orchestra

References

American male conductors (music)
1937 births
Classical saxophonists
American classical saxophonists
American male saxophonists
Texas classical music
Texas Christian University alumni
University of North Texas College of Music alumni
University of North Texas College of Music faculty
Living people
21st-century American saxophonists
21st-century American conductors (music)
21st-century American male musicians